The 1995 King George VI and Queen Elizabeth Stakes was a horse race held at Ascot Racecourse on Saturday 22 July 1995. It was the 45th running of the King George VI and Queen Elizabeth Stakes.

The winner was Saeed bin Maktoum al Maktoum's Lammtarra, a three-year-old chestnut colt trained at Newmarket, Suffolk by Saeed bin Suroor and ridden by Frankie Dettori. Lammtarra's victory was the first in the race for his owner, trainer and jockey..

The race
The race attracted a field of seven runners: five from the United Kingdom, and two from France. The favourite for the race was the undefeated three-year-old colt Lammtarra who had won the Epsom Derby on his most recent appearance. The best of the other British runners appeared to be another three-year-old colt, Pentire who had not contested the Derby but was unbeaten in his last four races, winning the Classic Trial Stakes, Dee Stakes, Predominate Stakes and King Edward VII Stakes. The French challengers were Carnegie, the winner of the Prix de l'Arc de Triomphe and the Grand Prix de Saint-Cloud and Winged Love, the winner of the Irish Derby. The other runners were Broadway Flyer (Chester Vase, Gordon Stakes), Strategic Choice (John Porter Stakes) and the seven-year-old veteran Environment Friend, the winner of the 1991 (Eclipse Stakes). Lammtarra headed the betting at odds of 9/4 ahead of Carnegie (11/4), Pentire (3/1) and Winged Love (9/2).

Broadway Flyer took the lead and set the pace Strategic Choice and Environment Friend with Carnegie, Winged Love and Lammtarra close behind and Pentire held up in last place Broadway Flyer maintained his lead into the straight where he was challenged on the outside by Strategic Choice, Lammtarra and Pentire with the last named gaining the advantage with two furlongs to run. The closing stages of the race developed into a struggle between Pentire and Lammtarra with the Derby winner prevailing. Strategic Choice held off the late challenge of Winged Love to take third, ahead of Broadway Flyer, Carnegie and Environment Friend.

Race details
 Sponsor: De Beers
 Purse: £452,070; First prize: £278,760
 Surface: Turf
 Going: Good to Firm
 Distance: 12 furlongs
 Number of runners: 7
 Winner's time: 2:31.01

Full result

 Abbreviations: nse = nose; nk = neck; shd = head; hd = head; dist = distance

Winner's details
Further details of the winner, Lammtarra
 Sex: Colt
 Foaled: 2 February 1992
 Country: United States
 Sire: Nijinsky; Dam: Snow Bride (Blushing Groom)
 Owner: Saeed bin Maktoum al Maktoum
 Breeder:  Gainsborough Farms

References

King George
 1995
King George VI and Queen Elizabeth Stakes
King George VI and Queen Elizabeth Stakes
20th century in Berkshire